Porters Lake (2011 population: 3,202) is a rural community in the Eastern Shore region of the Halifax, Nova Scotia, Canada, between Trunk 7 and Route 207, 27.8 km from Halifax. The residents mainly commute to jobs in Dartmouth, Burnside Industrial Park or in Downtown Halifax. The community is built around the lake from which it takes its name.

The Lake

Porters Lake is 19 km long, but never more than a kilometre wide and is in the shape of a crescent. The depth of Porters Lake varies significantly from the north end to the south end; the south end is approximately 5 meters deep on average, but the north end averages around 12 meters deep, with one part of the lake reaching 30 meters in depth. It is one of the most popular lakes for recreational boating in the region.  The Lake is connected to the Atlantic Ocean near Lawrencetown Beach, because of this, the lake varies in salinity from almost completely fresh water at the north end to nearly that of ocean water at the south end. The communities which surround Porters Lake include, Porters Lake, Middle Porters Lake, West Porters Lake, East Lawrencetown, Three Fathom Harbour and Seaforth.  Crowell Road and West Porters Lake Road, run along the west side of the lake. Porters Lake Provincial Park is located off West Porter's Lake Road along the west side of the Lake.  Hwy 107 crosses over the Lake and Hwy 7 runs north of the Lake.  Hwy 207 runs south of the lake until just past Three Fathom Harbour, where there is limited access to the Lake by road on the east side as the highway and residential communities run along the Atlantic Ocean coast.

Parks
Porters Lake Provincial Park

2008 Fire
On June 13, 2008, a forest fire broke out destroying two houses, damaging more than 20 others and burning almost 4,800 acres.  More than 5,000 residents were evacuated from their homes and several major roads were closed for 3 days. The fire was believed to have been caused by a camp fire, though the Royal Canadian Mounted Police laid no charges.  It was determined that residue from Hurricane Juan fueled the fire, which was the largest fire in an urban area of Nova Scotia, and the largest fire overall, in 30 years.

Demographics
Total population: 3217
Total dwellings: 1286
Total land area: 91.573 km²

See also
 Porters Lake Airport
 Porters Lake Water Aerodrome

References

Parks in Halifax, Nova Scotia
Communities in Halifax, Nova Scotia
Lakes of Nova Scotia
General Service Areas in Nova Scotia